For the Winter Olympics there are 22 venues that have been or will be used for speed skating. The first venues were outdoors on natural ice with the last one being held at 1956. Calgary's 1988 venue was the first to be constructed for indoor use. The last venue held outdoors was at the 1992 Winter Olympics in Albertville. Since the 1994 Games, all of the long track speed skating venues have been indoors.

References

Venues
 
Speed skating
Speed skating-related lists